Thurles Racecourse is a horse racing venue in the town of Thurles, County Tipperary, Ireland which stages National Hunt racing. Racing has taken place at Thurles since 1732 when a three-day festival took place at the venue.

The course is located 1.5 km west of the town centre. The course is an oval right handed track of one and a quarter miles with 6 flights of hurdles and 7 steeplechase fences in each circuit with a steep uphill finish.

It has been owned by the Molony family for over a hundred years. The current manager is Kate Molony, who in 2015 took over from her father Pierce, who took over from his father in 1974.

Notable races

References

External links
Official website
Go Racing Profile
Racing Post Profile

 
Horse racing venues in the Republic of Ireland
Race
Sports venues in County Tipperary
Sports venues completed in 1732